The Central Brooklyn Jazz Consortium (CBJC) created the Brooklyn Jazz Hall of Fame in 1999. A museum component added in 2009 to immortalize musicians, venues, and preserve artifacts which perpetuate Brooklyn's jazz legacy.

Description

Members of the Brooklyn Jazz Hall of Fame include: Lena Horne, Max Roach, Cecil Payne, Randy Weston, Eubie Blake, Herbie Mann, C. Scoby Stroman, Ahmed Abdul-Malik, Wynton Kelly, Irving "Duke" Jordan, Ronnie Mathews, Ernie Henry, Kenny Kirkland, Stanley Banks, and Noel Pointer just to name several.

This hall of fame awards notable Brooklyn jazz musicians, community members, and venues who have made an impact on Brooklyn's jazz community; 
the Deacon Leroy Applin Young Lion(ess) Award is given to parvenu.

See also
 List of music museums

References

Jazz awards
Music halls of fame
Halls of fame in New York City
Music museums in New York (state)
Culture of Brooklyn
Awards established in 1999
Organizations established in 1999
Proposed museums in the United States
1999 establishments in New York City
Jazz in New York City